Marsilio Ficino (19 October 1433 – 1 October 1499) was an Italian scholar and Catholic priest who was one of the most influential humanist philosophers of the early Italian Renaissance. He was an astrologer, a reviver of Neoplatonism in touch with the major academics of his day, and the first translator of Plato's complete extant works into Latin. His Florentine Academy, an attempt to revive Plato's Academy, influenced the direction and tenor of the Italian Renaissance and the development of European philosophy.

Early life
Ficino was born at Figline Valdarno. His father, Diotifeci d'Agnolo, was a physician under the patronage of Cosimo de' Medici, who took the young man into his household and became the lifelong patron of Marsilio, who was made tutor to his grandson, Lorenzo de' Medici. Giovanni Pico della Mirandola, the Italian humanist philosopher and scholar was another of his students.

Career and thought

Platonic Academy 
During the sessions at Florence of the Council of Ferrara-Florence in 1438–1445, during the failed attempts to heal the schism of the Eastern (Orthodox) and Western (Catholic) churches, Cosimo de' Medici and his intellectual circle had made acquaintance with the Neoplatonic philosopher George Gemistos Plethon, whose discourses upon Plato and the Alexandrian mystics so fascinated the humanists of Florence that they named him the second Plato. In 1459 John Argyropoulos was lecturing on Greek language and literature at Florence, and Ficino became his pupil.

When Cosimo decided to refound Plato's Academy at Florence, he chose Ficino as its head. In 1462, Cosimo supplied Ficino with Greek manuscripts of Plato's work, whereupon Ficino started translating the entire corpus into Latin (draft translation of the dialogues finished 1468–9; published 1484). Ficino also produced a translation of a collection of Hellenistic Greek documents found by Leonardo da Pistoia later called Hermetica, and the writings of many of the Neoplatonists, including Porphyry, Iamblichus, and Plotinus.

Among his many students were Niccolo Valori Francesco Cattani da Diacceto. The latter was considered by Ficino to be his successor as the head of the Florentine Platonic Academy. Diacceto's student, Giovanni di Bardo Corsi, produced a short biography of Ficino in 1506.

Theology, astrology, and the soul 

Though trained as a physician, Ficino became a priest in 1473. In 1474 Ficino completed his treatise on the immortality of the soul, Theologia Platonica de immortalitate animae (Platonic Theology) and De Christiana Religione (On the Christian Religion), a history of religions and defense of Christianity. In the rush of enthusiasm for every rediscovery from Antiquity, he exhibited some interest in the arts of astrology (despite denigrating it in relation to divine revelation), which landed him in trouble with the Catholic Church. In 1489 he was accused of heresy before Pope Innocent VIII and was acquitted.

Writing in 1492 Ficino proclaimed: 

Ficino's letters, extending over the years 1474–1494, survive and have been published. He wrote De amore (Of Love) in 1484. De vita libri tres (Three books on life), or De triplici vita (The Book of Life), published in 1489, provides a great deal of medical and astrological advice for maintaining health and vigor, as well as espousing the Neoplatonist view of the world's ensoulment and its integration with the human soul:

One metaphor for this integrated "aliveness" is Ficino's astrology. In the Book of Life, he details the interlinks between behavior and consequence. It talks about a list of things that hold sway over a man's destiny.

Medical works 
Probably due to early influences from his father, Diotifeci, who was a doctor to Cosimo de' Medici, Ficino published Latin and Italian treatises on medical subjects such as Consiglio contro la pestilenza (Recommendations for the treatment of the plague) and De vita libri tres (Three books on life). His medical works exerted considerable influence on Renaissance physicians such as Paracelsus, with whom he shared the perception on the unity of the microcosmos and macrocosmos, and their interactions, through somatic and psychological manifestations, with the aim to investigate their signatures to cure diseases. Those works, which were very popular at the time, dealt with astrological and alchemical concepts. Thus Ficino came under the suspicion of heresy; especially after the publication of the third book in 1489, which contained specific instructions on healthful living in a world of demons and other spirits.

Platonic love 
Notably, Ficino coined the term Platonic love, which first appeared in his letter to Alamanno Donati in 1476. In 1492, Ficino published Epistulae (Epistles), which contained Platonic love letters, written in Latin, to his academic colleague and life-long friend, Giovanni Cavalcanti, concerning the nature of Platonic love. Because of this, some have alleged Ficino was a homosexual, but this finds little basis in his letters. Regardless, Ficino's letters to Cavalcanti resulted in the popularization of the term Platonic love in Western Europe.

Death 
Ficino died on 1 October 1499 at Careggi. In 1521 his memory was honored with a bust sculpted by Andrea Ferrucci, which is located in the south side of the nave in the Cathedral of Santa Maria del Fiore.

Publications

 Theologia Platonica de immortalitate animae (Platonic Theology). Harvard University Press, Latin with English translation.
 vol. I, 2001. 
 vol. II, 2002. 
 vol. III, 2003. 
 vol. IV, 2004. 
 vol. V, 2005. 
 vol. VI with index, 2006. 
 The Letters of Marsilio Ficino. Shepheard-Walwyn Publishers. English translation in 11 vols. with extensive notes; the Language Department of the School of Economic Science.

 vol. I, 1975. 
 vol. II, 1978. 
 vol. III, 1981. 
 vol. IV, 1988. 
 vol. V, 1994. 
 vol. VI, 1999. 
 vol. VII, 2003 
 vol. VIII, 2010 
 vol. IX, 2013 
 Commentaries on Plato. I Tatti Renaissance Library. Bilingual, annotated English/Latin editions of Ficino's commentaries on the works of Plato.
 vol. I, 2008, Phaedrus, and Ion, tr. by Michael J. B. Allen, 
 vol. II, 2012, Parmenides, part I, tr. by Maude Vanhaelen, 
 vol. III, 2012, Parmenides, part II, tr. by Maude Vanhaelen, 
 Icastes. Marsilio Ficino's Interpretation of Plato's Sophist, edited and translated by Michael J. B. Allen, Berkeley: University of California Press, 1989.
The Book of Life, translated with an introduction by Charles Boer, Dallas: Spring Publications, 1980. ISBN 0-88214-212-7
 De vita libri tres (Three Books on Life, 1489) translated by Carol V. Kaske and John R. Clarke, Tempe, Arizona: The Renaissance Society of America, 2002. With notes, commentaries, and Latin text on facing pages. 

 De religione Christiana et fidei pietate (1475–6), dedicated to Lorenzo de' Medici.
 In Epistolas Pauli commentaria, Marsilii Ficini Epistolae (Venice, 1491; Florence, 1497).
 Meditations on the Soul: Selected letters of Marsilio Ficino, tr. by the Language Department of the School of Economic Science, London.  Rochester, Vermont: Inner Traditions International, 1996. . Note for instance, letter 31:  A man is not rightly formed who does not delight in harmony, pp. 5–60; letter 9: One can have patience without religion, pp. 16–18; Medicine heals the body, music the spirit, theology the soul, pp. 63–64; letter 77: The good will rule over the stars, p. 166.
 Commentary on Plato's Symposium on Love, translated with an introduction and notes by Sears Jayne. Woodstock, Conn.: Spring Publications (1985), 2nd edition, 2000. 
 Collected works: Opera (Florence,1491, Venice, 1516, Basel, 1561).

See also

References

Further reading
 
 Allen, Michael J. B., Nuptial Arithmetic: Marsilio Ficino's Commentary on the Fatal Number in Book VIII of Plato's Republic. Berkeley:  University of California Press, 1994. 
 Ernst Cassirer, Paul Oskar Kristeller, John Herman Randall, Jr., The Renaissance Philosophy of Man.  The University of Chicago Press (Chicago, 1948.) Marsilio Ficino, Five Questions Concerning the Mind, pp. 193–214.

 Anthony Gottlieb, The Dream of Reason: A History of Western Philosophy from the Greeks to the Renaissance (Penguin, London, 2001)  
 James Heiser, Prisci Theologi and the Hermetic Reformation in the Fifteenth Century (Repristination Press, Malone, Texas, 2011) 
 Paul Oskar Kristeller, Eight Philosophers of the Italian Renaissance.  Stanford University Press (Stanford California, 1964) Chapter 3, "Ficino," pp. 37–53.
 Raffini, Christine, "Marsilio Ficino, Pietro Bembo, Baldassare Castiglione: Philosophical, Aesthetic, and Political Approaches in Renaissance Platonism", Renaissance and Baroque Studies and Texts, v.21, Peter Lang Publishing, 1998. 
 Robb, Nesca A., Neoplatonism of the Italian Renaissance, New York: Octagon Books, Inc., 1968.
 Reeser, Todd W. Setting Plato Straight: Translating Ancient Sexuality in the Renaissance. Chicago: UChicagoP, 2016.
 Field, Arthur, The Origins of the Platonic Academy of Florence, New Jersey: Princeton, 1988.
 Allen, Michael J.B., and Valery Rees, with Martin Davies, eds. Marsilio Ficino : His Theology, His Philosophy, His Legacy.Leiden : E.J.Brill, 2002. A wide range of new essays.
 Voss, Angela, Marsilio Ficino, Western Esoteric Masters series. North Atlantic Books, 2006.

External links

 Platonis Opera Omnia (Latin)
 
 
 Marsilio Ficino entry by James G. Snyder in Internet Encyclopedia of Philosophy
  Short Biography of Ficino
 Catholic Encyclopedia entry
 The Influence of Marsilio Ficino
 www.ficino.it Website of the International Ficino Society
 Online Galleries, History of Science Collections, University of Oklahoma Libraries. High resolution images of works by and/or portraits of Marsilio Ficino in .jpg and .tiff format.

1433 births
1499 deaths
15th-century astrologers
15th-century Italian philosophers
15th-century Italian Roman Catholic priests
15th-century Italian Roman Catholic theologians
15th-century Italian writers
15th-century Latin writers
15th-century non-fiction writers
15th-century philosophers
15th-century translators
Book and manuscript collectors
Catholic philosophers
Christian humanists
Commentators on Plato
Epistemologists
Greek–Latin translators
Italian historians of religion
Italian astrologers
Italian essayists
Italian ethicists
Italian letter writers
Italian male non-fiction writers
Italian philosophers
Italian Renaissance humanists
Italian translators
Literacy and society theorists
Literary theorists
Medieval letter writers
Metaphilosophers
Metaphysicians
Metaphysics writers
Mystics
Neoplatonists
Ontologists
People from the Province of Florence
Perennial philosophy
Renaissance philosophy
Rhetoric theorists
Rhetoricians
Social commentators
Social philosophers
Writers about activism and social change
Writers about religion and science